The Airbus A320 family is a series of narrow-body airliners developed and produced by Airbus.

The A320 was launched in March 1984, first flew on 22 February 1987, and was introduced in April 1988 by Air France.
The first member of the family was followed by the longer A321 (first delivered in January 1994), the shorter A319 (April 1996), and the even shorter A318 (July 2003).
Final assembly takes place in Toulouse in France; Hamburg in Germany; Tianjin in China since 2009; and in Mobile, Alabama in the United States since April 2016.

The twinjet has a six-abreast cross-section and is powered by either CFM56 or IAE V2500 turbofans, except the CFM56/PW6000 powered A318.
The family pioneered the use of digital fly-by-wire and side-stick flight controls in airliners.

The 31.4 m (103 ft) long A318 typically accommodates 107 to 132 passengers.
The 124-156 seat A319 is 33.8 m (111 ft) long.
The A320 is 37.6 m (123 ft) long and can accommodate 150 to 186 passengers.
The 44.5 m (146 ft) A321 offers 185 to 230 seats.
The Airbus Corporate Jets are business jet versions.

In December 2010, Airbus announced the re-engined A320neo (new engine option), which entered service with Lufthansa in January 2016.
With more efficient turbofans and improvements including sharklets, it offers up to 15% better fuel economy.
Earlier A320s are now called A320ceo (current engine option).

American Airlines is the largest A320 operator with 467 aircraft in its fleet. In October 2019, the A320 family surpassed the Boeing 737 to become the highest-selling airliner. 
, a total of 16,874 A320s had been ordered and 10,747 delivered, of which 10,029 aircraft were in service with more than 340 operators. The global A320 fleet had completed more than 158 million flights over 292 million block hours since its entry into service.
The A320ceo initially competed with the 737 Classic and the MD-80, then their successors, the 737 Next Generation and the MD-90, while the 737 MAX is Boeing's response to the A320neo.

Development

Origins 

When Airbus designed the A300 during the late 1960s and early 1970s, it envisaged a broad family of airliners with which to compete against Boeing and Douglas (later McDonnell Douglas), two established US aerospace manufacturers. From the moment of formation, Airbus had begun studies into derivatives of the Airbus A300B in support of this long-term goal. Prior to the service introduction of the first Airbus airliners, engineers within Airbus had identified nine possible variations of the A300 known as A300B1 to B9. A 10th variation, conceived in 1973, later the first to be constructed, was designated the A300B10. It was a smaller aircraft which would be developed into the long-range Airbus A310. Airbus then focused its efforts on the single-aisle market, which was dominated by the 737 and McDonnell Douglas DC-9.

Plans from a number of European aircraft manufacturers called for a successor to the relatively successful BAC One-Eleven, and to replace the 737-200 and DC-9. Germany's MBB (Messerschmitt-Bölkow-Blohm), British Aircraft Corporation, Sweden's Saab and Spain's CASA worked on the EUROPLANE, a 180- to 200-seat aircraft. It was abandoned after intruding on A310 specifications. VFW-Fokker, Dornier and Hawker Siddeley worked on a number of 150-seat designs.

The design within the JET study that was carried forward was the JET2 (163 passengers), which then became the Airbus S.A1/2/3 series (Single Aisle), before settling on the A320 name for its launch in 1984. Previously, Hawker Siddeley had produced a design called the HS.134 "Airbus" in 1965, an evolution of the HS.121 (formerly DH.121) Trident, which shared much of the general arrangement of the later JET3 study design. The name "Airbus" at the time referred to a BEA requirement, rather than to the later international programme.

Design effort 

In June 1977 a new Joint European Transport (JET) programme was set up, established by British Aerospace (BAe), Aerospatiale, Dornier and Fokker. It was based at the then BAe (formerly Vickers) site in Weybridge, Surrey, UK. Although the members were all of Airbus' partners, they regarded the project as a separate collaboration from Airbus. This project was considered the forerunner of Airbus A320, encompassing the 130- to 188-seat market, powered by two CFM56s. It would have a cruise speed of Mach 0.84 (faster than the Boeing 737). The programme was later transferred to Airbus, leading up to the creation of the Single-Aisle (SA) studies in 1980, led by former leader of the JET programme, Derek Brown. The group looked at three different variants, covering the 125- to 180-seat market, called SA1, SA2 and SA3. Although unaware at the time, the consortium was producing the blueprints for the A319, A320 and A321, respectively. The single-aisle programme created divisions within Airbus about whether to design a shorter-range twinjet rather than a longer-range quadjet wanted by the West Germans, particularly Lufthansa. However, works proceeded, and the German carrier would eventually order the twinjet.

In February 1981 the project was re-designated A320, with efforts focused on the blueprint formerly designated SA2. During the year, Airbus worked with Delta Air Lines on a 150-seat aircraft envisioned and required by the airline. The A320 would carry 150 passengers over  using fuel from wing fuel tanks only. They would measure , respectively. Airbus considered a fuselage diameter of "the Boeing 707 and 727, or do something better" and settled on a wider cross-section with a  internal width, compared to Boeing's . Although heavier, this allowed the A320 to compete more effectively with the 737.

National shares
The UK, France and West Germany wanted responsibility over final assembly and its associated work, known as "work-share arguments". The Germans requested an increased work-share of 40%, while the British wanted the major responsibilities to be swapped around to give partners production and research and development experience. In the end, British work-share was increased from that of the two previous Airbuses.

France was willing to commit to launch aid, or subsidies, while the Germans were more cautious. The UK government was unwilling to provide funding for the tooling, requested by BAe and estimated at £250 million; it was postponed for three years. On 1 March 1984, the British government and BAe agreed that £50 million would be paid, whether the A320 flew or not, while the rest would be paid as a levy on each aircraft sold.
In 1984, the program cost was then estimated at £2 billion ($2.8 billion) by Flight International, equivalent to £ billion today.

Launch 

The programme was launched on 2 March 1984. At the time, Airbus had 96 orders. Air France was its first customer to sign a "letter of intent" for 25 A320s and options for 25 more at the 1981 Paris Air Show. In October 1983, British Caledonian placed seven firm orders, bringing total orders to more than 80. Cyprus Airways became the first customer to place an order for V2500-powered A320s in November 1984, followed by Pan Am with 16 firm orders and 34 options in January 1985, and then Inex Adria. One of the most significant orders occurred when Northwest Airlines placed an order for 100 A320s in October 1986, powered by CFM56 engines, later confirmed at the 1990 Farnborough Airshow.

During A320 development, Airbus considered propfan technology, which was backed by Lufthansa. At the time unproven, the technology essentially consisted of a fan placed outside the engine nacelle, offering turbofan speeds and turboprop economics; ultimately, Airbus stuck with turbofans.

It was the only engine available until the arrival of the IAE V2500, offered by International Aero Engines, a group composed of Rolls-Royce plc, Pratt & Whitney, Japanese Aero Engine Corporation, Fiat and MTU.

Entry into service 

In the presence of then-French Prime Minister Jacques Chirac and the Prince and Princess of Wales, the first A320 was rolled out of the final assembly line at Toulouse on 14 February 1987 and made its maiden flight on 22 February in 3 hours and 23 minutes. The flight test programme took 1,200 hours over 530 flights. European Joint Aviation Authorities (JAA) certification was awarded on 26 February 1988. The first A320 was delivered to Air France on 28 March, and began commercial service on 8 April with a flight between Paris and Berlin via Düsseldorf. In 1988, the clean-sheet aircraft program cost was 5.486 billion French francs.

Stretching the A320: A321

The first derivative of the A320 was the Airbus A321, also known as the Stretched A320, A320-500 and A325. Its launch came on 24 November 1988 after commitments for 183 aircraft from 10 customers were secured. The aircraft was to be a minimally changed derivative, apart from minor wing modifications and the fuselage stretch itself. The fuselage was lengthened by four plugs (two ahead and two behind the wings), making the A321  longer than the A320 overall. The length increase required enlarged overwing exits, which were repositioned in front of and behind the wings.

Final assembly for the A321 would be, as a first for any Airbus, carried out in Germany (then West Germany). This came after a dispute between the French, who claimed the move would incur $150 million (€135 million) in unnecessary expenditures associated with the new plant, and the Germans, who argued that it would be more productive for Airbus in the long run. The second production line was located at Hamburg, which would also subsequently produce the smaller Airbus A319 and A318. For the first time, Airbus entered the bond market, through which it raised $480 million (€475 million) to finance development costs. An additional $180 million (€175 million) was borrowed from the European Investment Bank and private investors.

The maiden flight of the Airbus A321 came on 11 March 1993, when the prototype, registration F-WWIA, flew with IAE V2500 engines; the second prototype, equipped with CFM56-5B turbofans, flew in May. Lufthansa and Alitalia were the first to order the stretched Airbuses, with 20 and 40 aircraft, respectively. The first of Lufthansa's V2500-A5-powered A321s arrived on 27 January 1994, while Alitalia received its first CFM56-5B-powered aircraft on 22 March.

Shrinking the A320: A319 

The A319 was the following derivative of the baseline A320. The design was a "shrink", with its origins in the 130- to 140-seat SA1, part of the Single-Aisle studies, which had been shelved as the consortium focused on its bigger siblings. After healthy sales of the A320/A321, Airbus focused once more on what was then known as the A320M-7, meaning A320 minus seven fuselage frames. It would provide direct competition for the 737-300/-700. Consequently, the number of overwing exits was reduced from four to two. The bulk-cargo door was replaced by an aft container door, which can take in reduced height LD3-45 containers. Minor software changes were made to accommodate the different handling characteristics; otherwise the aircraft was largely unchanged.

Airbus began offering the new model from 22 May 1992, with the actual launch of the $275 million (€250 million) programme occurring on 10 June 1993; the A319's first customer was ILFC, which signed for six aircraft. On 23 March 1995, the first A319 underwent final assembly at Airbus' German plant in Hamburg, where A321s were also assembled. It was rolled out on 24 August 1995, with the maiden flight taking place the following day. The certification programme took 350 airborne hours involving two aircraft. Certification for the CFM56-5B6/2-equipped variant was granted in April 1996, and qualification for the V2524-A5 started the following month.

Delivery of the first A319, to Swissair, occurred on 25 April 1996; it entered service by month's end. In January 1997, an A319 broke a record during a delivery flight by flying the  great circle route to Winnipeg, Manitoba from Hamburg in 9 hours and 5 minutes. The A319 has proven popular with low-cost airlines such as EasyJet, which purchased 172 of them.

Second shrink: A318 

The A318 was born out of mid-1990 studies between Aviation Industry Corporation of China (AVIC), Singapore Technologies Aerospace, Alenia and Airbus on a 95- to 125-seat aircraft project. The programme was called the AE31X, and covered the 95-seat AE316 and 115- to 125-seat AE317. Costing $2 billion (€1.85 billion) to develop, aircraft production was to take place in China.

Simultaneously, Airbus was developing the Airbus A318. In early 1998, Airbus revealed that it was designing a 100-seat aircraft based on the A320. The AE31X project was terminated by September 1998, and Airbus officially announced the A318 at that year's Farnborough Airshow. The aircraft was the smallest in Airbus's product range, and was developed coincidentally at the same time as the largest commercial aircraft in history, the Airbus A380. First called A319M5 in as early as March 1995, it was shorter by  ahead of the wing and  behind. These cuts reduced passenger capacity from 124 on the A319 to 107 passengers in a two-class layout.

The 107-seater was launched on 26 April 1999 with the options and orders count at 109 aircraft. After three years of design, the maiden flight took place at Hamburg on 15 January 2002. Tests on the lead engine, the PW6000, revealed worse-than-expected fuel consumption. Consequently, Pratt & Whitney abandoned the five-stage high-pressure compressor (HPC) for the MTU-designed six-stage HPC. The 129 order book for the A318 shrunk to 80 largely because of switches to other A320 family members. After 17 months of flight certification, during which 850 hours and 350 flights were accumulated, JAA certification was obtained for the CFM56-powered variant on 23 May 2003. On 22 July 2003, first delivery for launch customer Frontier Airlines occurred, entering service before the end of the month.

Production 

The Toulouse Blagnac final assembly line builds A320s, whereas the Hamburg Finkenwerder final assembly line builds A318s, A319s, and A321s. The Airbus factory in Tianjin, China assembles A319s, A320s, and A321s; A320s and A321s are also assembled at the Airbus Americas factory in Mobile, Alabama. Airbus produced a total of 42 A320s per month in 2015, and expects to increase to 50 per month in 2017.

Production of parts takes place in a large number of countries around the world, eg; center fuselage is made in Hamburg, Germany, horizontal stabilizer is produced in Getafe, Spain, rudder is produced in Harbin, China.

As Airbus targets a 60 monthly global production rate by mid-2019, the Tianjin line delivered 51 in 2016 and it could assemble six per month from four as it starts producing A320neos in 2017; 147 Airbus were delivered in 2016 in China, 20% of its production, mostly A320-family, a 47% market share as the country should become the world's largest market ahead of the US before 2027.

In June 2018, along a larger and modernised delivery centre, Airbus inaugurated its fourth Hamburg production line, with two seven-axis robots to drill 80% of fuselage upper side holes, autonomous mobile tooling platforms and following Design Thinking principles. By January 2019, Mobile was outputting 4.5 A320s per month, raising to five by the end of the year.

In September 2019, Airbus reached a milestone with the delivery of the 9000th A320-family aircraft to Easyjet. In October 2019, Airbus inaugurated a highly automated fuselage structure assembly line for A320 Family aircraft in Hamburg, showcasing an evolution in Airbus' industrial production system. Production rates continue to rise, and Airbus aims to reach a production rate of 63 aircraft per month by 2021, which would result in the 10,000th delivery occurring early that year.

Due to the impact of the COVID-19 pandemic on aviation, demand for new jets was reduced in 2020 and Airbus cut its monthly production from 60 to 40 A320s.
In October 2020, the 500th A320 built in Tianjin, an A320neo, was delivered to China Southern, twelve years after the final assembly line start in 2008.

A320 Enhanced

Improvements
In 2006, Airbus started the A320 Enhanced (A320E) programme as a series of improvements targeting a 4–5% efficiency gain, with large winglets (2%), aerodynamic refinements (1%), weight savings and a new aircraft cabin.
Engine improvements that reduced fuel consumption by 1% were made to the A320 in 2007 with the CFM56 Tech Insertion and in 2008 with the V2500Select (One).

Sharklets

In 2006, Airbus tested three styles of winglets intended to counteract the wing's lift-induced drag and wingtip vortices more effectively than the previous wingtip fence. The first design type to be tested was developed by Airbus and based on work done by the  programme. The second type of winglet incorporated a more blended design and was designed by Winglet Technology, a company based in Wichita, Kansas, USA. Two aircraft were used in the flight test evaluation campaign – the prototype A320, which had been retained by Airbus for testing, and a new build aircraft which was fitted with both types of winglets before it was delivered to JetBlue.

Despite the anticipated efficiency gains and development work, Airbus announced that those winglets would not be offered to customers, claiming that the weight of the modifications required negated any aerodynamic benefits. On 17 December 2008, Airbus announced it was to begin flight testing an existing blended winglet design developed by Aviation Partners Inc. as part of an A320 modernisation programme using the A320 prototype.

In December 2011, Airbus filed suit in the western district of Texas over Aviation Partners' claims of infringement of its patents on winglet design and construction which were granted in 1993. Airbus' lawsuit seeks to reject responsibility to pay royalties to Aviation Partners for using its designs, despite work performed together with both parties to develop advanced winglets for the Airbus A320neo.

The first sharklet-equipped Airbus A320 was delivered to Indonesia AirAsia on 21 December 2012, offering a  payload and  range increases over the original aircraft specifications.

Cabin
In 2007, Airbus introduced a new enhanced, quieter cabin with better luggage storage and a more modern look and feel, and a new galley that reduced weight, increased revenue space and improved ergonomics and design for food hygiene and recycling. It offered a new air purifier with filters and a catalytic converter, removing unpleasant smells from the air before it is pumped into the cabin, as well as LEDs for mood lighting and a new passenger service unit (PSU).

Offering 10% more overhead bin volume, more shoulder room, a weight reduction, a new intercom and in-flight entertainment system, noise reduction and slimmer PSU, the enhanced cabin can be retrofitted. The flight crew controls the cabin through touchscreen displays.

New Engine Option 

The A320neo (neo for new engine option) is a development launched on 1 December 2010, making its first flight on 25 September 2014 and introduced by Lufthansa on 25 January 2016. Re-engined with CFM International LEAP-1A or Pratt & Whitney PW1000G engines and with large sharklets, it was designed to be 15% more fuel efficient. Its three variants are based on the previous A319, A320 and A321. Airbus received 6,031 orders by March 2018 and delivered 318 by May 2018. The original family was renamed A320ceo, for current engine option.

Replacement airliner 
In 2006, Airbus was studying a future replacement for the A320 series, tentatively dubbed NSR, for "New Short-Range aircraft". The follow-on aircraft to replace the A320 was named A30X. Airbus North America President Barry Eccleston stated that the earliest the aircraft could have been available was 2017. In January 2010, John Leahy, Airbus's chief operating officer-customers, stated that an all-new single-aisle aircraft was unlikely to be constructed before 2024 or 2025.

Design 

The Airbus A320 family are narrow-body (single-aisle) aircraft with a retractable tricycle landing gear and powered by two wing pylon-mounted turbofan engines.
After the oil price rises of the 1970s, Airbus needed to minimise the trip fuel costs of the A320. To that end, it adopted composite primary structures, centre-of-gravity control using fuel, a glass cockpit (EFIS) and a two-crew flight deck.

Airbus claimed the 737-300 burns 35% more fuel and has a 16% higher operating cost per seat than the V2500-powered A320.
Its wing is long and thin, offering better aerodynamic efficiency because of the higher aspect ratio than the competing 737 and MD-80.

Airframe 

The Airbus A320 family are low-wing cantilever monoplanes with a conventional empennage with a single vertical stabilizer and rudder. Its wing sweep is 25 degrees. Its cargo hold can accommodate unit load device containers.

The A320 airframe includes composite materials and aluminium alloys to save weight and reduce the total number of parts to decrease the maintenance costs. Its tail assembly is made almost entirely of such composites by CASA, which also builds the elevators, main landing gear doors, and rear fuselage parts.

Flight deck 

The A320 flight deck features a full glass cockpit, rather than the hybrid versions found in previous airliners. It is also equipped with an Electronic Flight Instrument System (EFIS) with side-stick controllers. The A320 has an Electronic Centralised Aircraft Monitor (ECAM) to give the flight crew information about all of the systems on the aircraft. The only analog instruments were the radio-magnetic indicator and brake pressure indicator.

Since 2003, the A320 has featured liquid crystal display (LCD) units on the flight deck instead of the original cathode ray tube (CRT) displays. These include both main displays and the backup artificial horizon, which also previously had an analog display.

Airbus offers an avionics upgrade for older A320 aircraft, the In-Service Enhancement Package, to keep them updated. Digital head-up displays are available.

The A320 retained the dark cockpit (where an indicator is off when its system is running; useful for drawing attention to dysfunctions when an indicator is lit) from the A310, the first widebody designed to be operated without a flight engineer and influenced by Bernard Ziegler, first Airbus CEO Henri Ziegler's son.

Fly-by-wire 
The A320 is the world's first airliner with digital fly-by-wire (FBW) flight control system: input commands through the side-stick are interpreted by flight control computers and transmitted to flight control surfaces within the flight envelope protection; in the 1980s the computer-controlled dynamic system of the Dassault Mirage 2000 fighter cross-fertilised the Airbus team which tested FBW on an A300. At its introduction, fly-by-wire and flight envelope protection was a new experience for many pilots.

All following Airbuses have similar human/machine interface and systems control philosophy to facilitate cross-type qualification with minimal training. For Roger Béteille, then Airbus president, introducing fly-by-wire with flight envelope protection was one of the most difficult decisions he had ever made, explaining: "Either we were going to be first with new technologies or we could not expect to be in the market."

Early A320s used the Intel 80186 and Motorola 68010. In 1988, the flight management computer contained six Intel 80286 CPUs, running in three logical pairs, with 2.5 megabytes of memory.

Engines 
The suppliers providing turbofan engines for the A320ceo family were CFM International with the CFM56, International Aero Engines offering its V2500, and Pratt & Whitney's PW6000 engines available only for the A318, while for the A320neo family are CFM International LEAP-1A or Pratt & Whitney PW1000G engines.

Operational history 
The Joint Aviation Authorities (JAA) issued the type certificate for the A320 on 26 February 1988. After entering the market on 18 April 1988 with Air France, Airbus then expanded the A320 family rapidly, launching the 185-seat A321 in 1989 and first delivered it in 1994; launching the 124-seat A319 in 1993 and delivering it in 1996; and launching the 107-seat A318 in 1999 with first deliveries in 2003.

, the global A320 fleet had 99.7 percent operational reliability in the last 12 months and completed more than 158 million flights over 292 million block hours since its entry into service.

Competition

The A320 family was developed to compete with the Boeing 737 Classics (-300/-400/-500) and the McDonnell Douglas MD-80/90 series, and has since faced challenges from the Boeing 737 Next Generation (-600/-700/-800/-900) and the 717 during its two decades in service. As of 2010, as well as the 737, the A320 family faces competition from Embraer's E-195 (to the A318), and the CSeries being developed by Bombardier to the A318/A319.

Airbus has delivered 8,605 A320 family aircraft since their certification/first delivery in early 1988, with another 6,056 on firm order (as of 31 December 2018). In comparison, Boeing has shipped 10,444 737 series since late 1967, with 8,918 of those deliveries since March 1988, and has a further 4,763 on firm order (as of 31 December 2018).

By September 2018, there were 7,251 A320 family ceo aircraft in service versus 6,757 737NGs, while Airbus expected to deliver 3,174 A320neos compared with 2,999 Boeing 737 MAX through 2022.
Airbus sold the A320 well to low-cost startups and offering a choice of engines could make them more attractive to airlines and lessors than the single sourced 737, but CFM engines are extremely reliable.
The six-month head-start of the A320neo allowed Airbus to rack up 1,000 orders before Boeing announced the MAX.
The A321 has outsold the 737-900 three to one, as the A321neo is again dominating the 737-9 MAX, to be joined by the 737-10 MAX.

 
 

<noinclude>

Maintenance
A Checks are every 750 flight hours and structural inspections are at six- and 12-year intervals.

Variants 

The baseline A320 has given rise to a family of aircraft which share a common design but with passenger capacity ranges from 100, on the A318, to 220, on the A321. They compete with the 737, 757, and 717. Because the four variants share the same flight deck, all have the same pilot type rating. Today all variants are available as corporate jets. An A319 variant known as A319LR is also developed. Military versions like A319 MPA also exists. American Airlines is the largest airline operator of the A320 family of aircraft with 392 aircraft in service as of 30 September 2017.

Technically, the name "A320" only refers to the original mid-sized aircraft, but it is often informally used to indicate any of the A318/A319/A320/A321 family. All variants are able to be ETOPS (Extended-range Twin-engine Operational Performance Standards) certified for 180 minutes since 2004 (EASA) and 2006 (FAA). With launch of the new Airbus A320neo project, the previous members of the Airbus A320 family received the "current engine option" or "CEO" name.

A318 

The Airbus A318 is the smallest member of the Airbus A320 family. The aircraft entered service in July 2003 with Frontier Airlines, and shares a common type rating with all other Airbus A320 family variants, allowing existing A320 family pilots to fly the aircraft without the need for further training. It is the largest commercial aircraft certified by the European Aviation Safety Agency for steep approach operations, allowing flights at airports such as London City Airport. Relative to other Airbus A320 family variants, the A318 has sold in only small numbers with total orders for only 80 aircraft placed .
In 2018, the A318 list price was US$77.4 million.

A319 

The A319 is  shorter than the A320.
Also known as the A320M-7, it is a shortened, minimum-change version of the A320 with four frames fore of the wing and three frames aft of the wing removed. Four propulsion options available on the A319 are the  IAE V2500, or the  CFM56. Although identical to those of the A320, these engines are derated because of the A319's lower MTOW.

The A319 was developed at the request of Steven F. Udvar-Házy, the former president and CEO of ILFC. The A319's launch customer, in fact, was ILFC, which had placed an order for six A319s by 1993. Anticipating further orders by Swissair and Alitalia, Airbus decided to launch the programme on 10 June 1993. Final assembly of the first A319 began on 23 March 1995 and it was first introduced with Swissair in April 1996. The direct Boeing competitor is the Boeing 737-700.

A total of 1,460 of the A319ceo model have been delivered with 24 remaining on order as of 30 September 2017. A 1998 A319 was $35 million new; the value was halved by 2009, and reached scrap levels by 2019.
In 2018, the A319 list price was US$92.3 million.

ACJ319  

The A319CJ (rebranded the ACJ319) is the corporate jet version of the A319. Upon resale, the aircraft can be reconfigured as a standard A319 by removing its extra tanks and corporate cabin outfit, thus maximising its resale value. It was formerly also known as the ACJ, or Airbus Corporate Jet, while starting with 2014 it has the marketing designation ACJ319.

The aircraft seats up to 39 passengers, but may be outfitted by the customers into any configuration. Tyrolean Jet Services Mfg. GmbH & CO KG, MJET and Reliance Industries are among its users. The A319CJ competes with other ultralarge-cabin corporate jets such as the Boeing 737-700-based Boeing Business Jet (BBJ) and Embraer Lineage 1000, as well as with large-cabin and ultralong-range Gulfstream G650, Gulfstream G550 and Bombardier's Global 6000. It is powered by the same engine types as the A320. The A319CJ was used by the Escadron de Transport, d'Entraînement et de Calibration which is in charge of transportation for France's officials and also by the Flugbereitschaft of the German Air Force for transportation of Germany's officials. An ACJ serves as a presidential or official aircraft of Armenia, Azerbaijan, Brazil, Bulgaria, Czech Republic, Germany, Italy, Malaysia, Slovakia, Thailand, Turkey, Ukraine, and Venezuela.

A320 

The A320 series has two variants, the A320-100 and A320-200. Only 21 A320-100s were produced. These aircraft, the first to be manufactured, were delivered to Air Inter later acquired by Air France and British Airways as a result of an order from British Caledonian made prior to its acquisition.

The primary differences with the -100 were the -200's wingtip fences and increased fuel capacity, providing increased range. Indian Airlines used its first 31 A320-200s with double-bogie main landing gear for airfields with poor runway conditions, which a single-bogie main gear could not manage.

A total of 4,512 of the A320ceo model have been delivered, with 220 remaining on order as of 30 September 2017. The closest Boeing competitor is the 737-800.

In 1988, the value of a new A320 was $30 million, reaching $40 million by the end of the 1990s, a 30% increase lower than the inflation, it dipped to $37 million after 2001, then peaked to $47 million in 2008, and stabilised at $40–42 million until the transition to the A320neo.
In 2018, its list price was US$101.0 million.

A321 

As the A320 was beginning operations in 1988, the A321 was launched as its first derivative the same year. The maiden flight of the first of two prototypes came on 11 March 1993. The A321-100 entered service in January 1994 with Lufthansa.

As the A321-100 range was less than the A320, development of the heavier and longer range A321-200 began in 1995. The higher range was achieved through higher thrust engines (V2533-A5 or CFM56-5B3), minor structural strengthening, and an increase in fuel capacity with the installation of one or two optional  tanks in the rear underfloor hold. It first flew in December 1996 and entered service with Monarch Airlines in April 1997.

The A321's closest Boeing competitors are the 737-900/900ER, and the 757-200. A total 1,562 of the A321ceo model have been delivered, with 231 remaining on order as of 30 September 2017. In 2018, the A321 list price was US$118.3 million.

Conversions

Freighter 

 A321P2F
A programme to convert A320 and A321 aircraft into freighters was set up by Airbus Freighter Conversion GmbH. Airframes would be converted by Elbe Flugzeugwerke GmbH (EFW) in Dresden, Germany, and Zhukovsky, Russia. The launch customer AerCap signed a firm contract on 16 July 2008 to convert 30 of AerCap's passenger A320/A321s into A320/A321P2F (passenger to freighter). However, on 3 June 2011, Airbus announced all partners would end the passenger to freighter programme, citing high demand for used airframes for passenger service.

On 17 June 2015 ST Aerospace signed agreements with Airbus and EFW for a collaboration to launch the A320/A321 passenger-to-freighter (P2F) conversion programme.
In August 2019, Qantas was announced as the launch operator for the A321P2F converted freighter, for Australia Post, with up to three aircraft to be introduced in October 2020. Titan Airways received their first A321P2F in January 2021 which was converted at Singapore Seletar Airport, the airline has two more A321P2F's that are yet to be converted.

The initial converted aircraft first flew on 22 January 2020, to be delivered to Vallair, and it secured EASA supplementary type certificate in February.
Airbus sees a market for 1,000 narrowbody conversions over the 2020-2040 period. On 27 October 2020, the first A321P2F was delivered to launch operator Qantas Airways, with windows and exit doors removed, and a large hydraulically actuated main cargo door installed.

 A320P2F
After EFW began the first A320 conversion in March 2021, the A320P2F made its maiden three-hour flight on 8 December from Singapore.
The aircraft was first delivered in 2006, and its first cargo operator will be Nairobi-based Astral Aviation from the second quarter of 2022, leased from Middle Eastern lessor Vaayu Group.
The A320P2F received its supplemental type certification at the end of March 2022.

 Cargo
The A320P2F is the best option for express domestic and regional operations. The freighter can accommodate up to 27 metric tonnes over 1,900 nautical miles and offers space for 14 large containers/pallets on the main deck and 10 LD3-type containers on the lower deck.

Airborne Early Warning 
The Indian Defence Ministry greenlit the modification by the Defence Research and Development Organisation of six Air India A320s into Airborne early warning and control planes for Rs 10,500 crore (US$ million). They are to complement the two Indian-built Netra and three Israeli-and-Russian-made Phalcons of the Indian Air Force.

Operators 

, there were 10,029 A320 family aircraft in commercial service with over 330 operators. The five largest operators were American Airlines, operating 467, China Eastern Airlines with 370, EasyJet 331, China Southern Airlines 312 and IndiGo 267. Aircraft in operation include 58 A318, 1,359 A319 (1,349 ceo + 10 neo), 5,949 A320 (4,298 ceo + 1,651 neo) and 2,663 A321 (1,732 ceo + 931 neo) aircraft. 663 A320ceo family aircraft consisting of 22 A318s, 135 A319s, 454 A320s and 52 A321s were out of service through retirement or write-off.

 
Air France, British Airways, and Frontier Airlines are the only operators to have operated all four variants of the A320ceo family. Middle East Airlines received two milestone aircraft. The first was an A320ceo with manufacturer serial number (MSN) 5,000 on 20 January 2012. Eight years later, on 9 October 2020, the airline received MSN 10,000, an A321neo, at the celebration of its 75th anniversary. 
In December 2022, over 10,000 A320 family aircraft were operated by more than 330 airlines, completing more than 158 million flights or 292 million hours in the air.

Orders and deliveries

The A320ceo family was the fastest-selling airliner from 2005 to 2007. Its successor, the A320neo family, improved on this with 1,420 orders and commitments in less than a year in 2011.

In November 2013, the A320 family aircraft reached 10,000 orders.

In October 2019, the A320 family became the highest-selling airliner family with 15,193 orders, surpassing the Boeing 737's total of 15,136.

In August 2021, the A320 family passed the 10,000 delivery mark, 33 years after its introduction, versus 50 years for the Boeing 737, which passed the 10,000 delivery mark in March 2018.

On 16 December 2021, the last member of the A320ceo family, an A321ceo (MSN 10315), was delivered from the assembly line Airbus Mobile in Alabama.

In July 2022, total orders for the A320neo family reached 8,502, exceeding the total orders for the A320ceo family of 8,120.

, a total of 10,747 A320 family aircraft had been delivered, with 20 A320ceos (2 A319s, 11 A320s and 7 A321s) remaining in the backlog. In the first  two months of 2023, Airbus delivered 55 A320 family aircraft, comprising A320neo variants only. The A320 family backlog was over the 6,000 mark again, with A321s accounting for 60% and total orders reached 16,874, whereas cancellations incurred during the Boeing 737 MAX groundings brought total orders for the 737 slightly up to 15,576 aircraft, of which 11,264 had been delivered.

Data .

Accidents and incidents 

Across the entire A320 family, 160 major aviation accidents and incidents have occurred, including 48 hull loss accidents (the latest being LATAM Perú Flight 2213 on 18 November 2022), for a total of  fatalities. The A320 family has experienced 50 incidents in which several flight displays were lost.

As of 2015, the Airbus A320 family had experienced 0.12 fatal hull loss accidents for every million takeoffs and 0.26 total hull loss accidents for every million takeoffs.

Specifications

Engines

See also

Notes

References

External links 

 Official Airbus website of the A320 aircraft family
 

 
A320
1980s international airliners
Twinjets
Aircraft first flown in 1987
Low-wing aircraft